Nowkand or Now Kand may refer to:
 Now Kand, Alborz
 Nowkand, Birjand
 Nowkand, Sarbisheh